Familial natural short sleep is a rare, genetic, typically inherited trait where an individual sleeps for fewer hours than average without suffering from daytime sleepiness or other consequences of sleep deprivation. This process is entirely natural in this kind of individual, and it is caused by certain genetic mutations. A person with this trait is known as a "natural short sleeper".

This condition is not to be confused with intentional sleep deprivation, which leaves symptoms such as irritability or temporarily impaired cognitive abilities in people who are predisposed to sleep a normal amount of time but not in people with FNSS.

This sleep type is not considered to be a genetic disorder, but rather, it is considered to be a genetic, benign trait.

Presentation

Signs 

Individuals with this trait are known for having the life-long ability of being able to sleep for a lesser amount of time than average people, usually 4 to 6 hours (less than the average sleeptime of 8 hours) each night while waking up feeling relatively well-rested, they also have a notable absence of any sort of consequence that derives from depriving oneself of sleep, something an average person would not be able to do on the sleeptime (and the frequency of said sleeptime) that is common for people with FNSS.

Another common trait among people with familial natural short sleep is an increased ability at recalling memories. Other common traits include outgoing personality, high productiveness, lower body mass index than average (possibly due to faster metabolism), higher resilience and heightened pain tolerance. All of these traits are of slightly better quality in people with natural short sleep than in people with natural normal sleep, essentially making them slightly more efficient than average people.

Onset 

This condition is life-long, meaning that a natural short sleeper has naturally slept for a shorter time than average for most, if not all, of their lives.

Inheritance 

This trait is inherited as an autosomal dominant trait, which means that for a person to be a natural short sleeper, they must have at least one copy of a mutation related to this condition, this mutation must have been either inherited or it must have arisen from a spontaneous genetic error. A carrier for a mutation associated with FNSS has a 50% chance of transmitting the mutation to one of their offspring.

Complications 

This condition has no known health complications associated with it.

A study done in 2001 showed that natural short sleepers are more prone to subclinical hypomania, a temporary mental state most common during adolescence characterized by racing thoughts, abnormally high focus on goal-directed activities, unusually euphoric mood, and a perceptual innecessity for sleep.

Genetics 

Five genes and around four to seven genetic mutations have been found to be implicated in the condition:

DEC2/BHLHE41 

BHLHE41, also known as DEC2, is a gene located in chromosome 12 which encodes a protein called "basic helix-loop-helix transcription factor repressor". The gene is known for influencing the mechanics of the circadian rhythm which in and of itself influences sleep patterns, specifically the amount of sleep one gets.

hDEC2-P385R 

This missense mutation (also known as "rs121912617") is located in exon 5 of the gene and it consists of a C>G substitution in the coding region of DEC2 which results in a proline to arginine substitution at amino acid position 385 of the gene. This mutation impairs DEC2's ability at suppressing expression of the prepro-orexin, leading to higher expression of orexin.

A mouse animal model was made in the same study that described the first 2 patients known to medical literature with the mutation; the mice that carried the mouse equivalent to the human DEC2-P385R mutation had, on average, about 1.2 hours more daytime activity than mice without the mutation. There were numerous other findings in the mutant mice, including an increased number of wakefulness episodes during a 12-hour time period compared to wild-type mice.

Y362H 

This mutation has only been described in one of two dizygotic African-American twins. The affected twin was a 27-year old man who was found to have a non-synonymous mutation in amino acid position 362 in the fifth exon of the BHLHE41 gene which consisted of a substitution in the coding region of the gene from C>T which lead to an amino acid substitution of tyrosine to histidine. After deprivating them of sleep for over 38 hours, the researchers leading the study that described the pair of twins, total sleep time from both twins was measured; the results showed that the twin carrying the Y362H mutation had a recovering total sleep time of 482 minutes, while his twin slept for 572 minutes. Other findings in the Y362H twin included a higher delta power (measured with EEG) during NREM compared to his unaffected twin brother, resistance to the effects sleep deprivation has on one's neurobehavioral system, etc.

ADRB1 

ADRB1 is a gene located in chromosome 10 which encodes for the beta-1 adrenergic receptor protein. It plays a role in certain sleep patterns.

β1AR A187V 

Only 4,028 out of every 100,000 people worldwide carry this mutation, it involves a C>T substitution in the coding region of ADRB1 which causes a substitution of alanine to valine in amino acid position 507 of the gene.

NPSR1 

NPSR1 (formerly known as GPR154) is a gene located in chromosome 7. It encodes a plasma membrane protein which works as a neuropeptide S receptor of sorts, the function of the protein influences various cellular processes.

NSPR1-Y206H 

This is a rare genetic mutation that has only been found in a man and his son, who slept between 4 and 5 hours a night each. This mutation consists of a substitution from tyrosine to histidine at amino acid position 206 of the gene.

A mouse animal model in the same study that described the father and son showed that mutant mice (206H) slept, on average, around 71 minutes less than mice with the wild-type version (Y206) of the gene. They also found other characteristics in mutant mice, including high delta power during sleep, lesser memory deficits, etc.

GRM1 

GRM1 is a gene located in chromosome 6, it encodes a protein called metabotropic glutamate receptor 1 whose main function is activating phospholipase C.

GRM1b-R889W 

This loss-of-function mutation is located in the C-terminal intracellular domain of the isoform mGluR1b in GRM1, it consists of a substitution from arginine to tryptophan at amino acid position 889 of the gene. The mutation impairs ERK activation. Only one family with the mutation has been officially described in the medical literature.

Mouse animal models of the mutation showed that mice with the mutant allele (889W) slept on average 25 minutes less than mice with the wild-type (R889) allele, mutant mice also had a tendency to sleep less during their dark phase.

GRM1-S458A 

This loss-of-function mutation is located in the large N-terminal extracellular domain of all GRM1 isoforms, and it consists of a substitution from serine to alanine at amino acid position 458 of the gene. The mutation impairs ERK activation. Only one family with the mutation has been officially described in the medical literature.

Mouse animal models of the mutation showed that mice with the mutant allele (458A) slept on average 25 minutes less than mice with the wild-type (S458) allele, mutant mice also had a tendency to sleep less during their dark phase.

Diagnosis 

Diagnosis is usually not necessary, as this trait isn't considered a disorder in and of itself, however, there are various methods one's doctor can use to diagnose the condition, including but not limited to the use of questionnaires such as the morningness-eveningness questionnaire, the Munich chronotype questionnaire, etc. Clinical diagnostic methods for the condition include electroencephalograms, delta-power analyses, and genetic testing.

Differential diagnosis 

There are other conditions similar to this specific trait that share some characteristics between each other, these include:

Advanced sleep phase syndrome, this is a rare condition affecting the circadian rhythm in which individuals have an early sleep onset and equally early sleep awakening that is part of their regular sleep schedule. While both sleep traits are similar in the sense of early awakening, patients with FASP typically spend the same amount of time (8 hours) sleeping as an average person, while patients with FNSS don't. Another difference between the two is that early sleep onset isn't a feature shown by people with familial natural short sleep. Like familial natural short sleep, it has the tendency to be hereditary.
Delayed sleep phase syndrome, this is a more common circadian rhythm condition (estimated to affect around 16% of adolescents in the U.S.) characterized by late sleep onset and equally late sleep awakening. While both sleep traits are similar in the sense of late sleep-onset, individuals with FNSS don't suffer from late sleep awakening. Unlike FNSS, this condition isn't highly heritable, but it does seem to have at least some genetic component linked to it.

List of conditions that may be confused with FNSS include:

Insomnia, this is a common sleep disorder which can be acute or chronic and is characterized by an individual's difficulty to fall asleep, this usually leads to them to stay up late involuntarily which shortens their sleep time. While insomnia and FNSS share some common features (late sleep onset, for example), those with insomnia do suffer from the consequences associated with sleep deprivation, something people with FNSS do not suffer from, as they actually have a resistance against them.

Treatment

Prevalence 

It is estimated that approximately 1 to 3 percent of the population has the trait. In the U.S., natural short sleepers are part of a large group comprising 30–35% of the population who sleep less than recommended.

Familial natural short sleep and Alzheimer's disease 

For some unknown reason, individuals with this condition (and their associated mutations) might be genetically protected against neurodegenerative disorders, mainly those that cause dementia, such as Alzheimer's disease.

Ying-Hui Fu did a study using animal mouse models who were genetically engineered to carry mutations associated with natural short sleep and mutations associated with an increased risk of suffering from dementia, the results showed that mice with both FNSS and dementia mutations didn't show as much symptoms of dementia as their dementia-alone predisposed mice counterparts, the same mice who had both Alzheimer's and short sleep gene mutations also had lesser amounts of Aβ plaque depositions in their hippocampuses and brain cortexes than those who only carried the Alzheimer's mutations. The FNSS-related mutations that were used in the study were DEC2-P384R and NPSR1-Y206H, and the Alzheimer's disease-related mutations were PS19 and 5XFAD.

History 

This condition first entered the medical literature in 2009 when Ying-Hui Fu, from the University of San Francisco, described a woman and her daughter from the United States who manifested signs of the condition, the both of them slept for an average of 6 hours, while their unaffected family members slept from 7 to 9 hours a night. The mother, who was well into her 70s, reportedly had a very active and healthy lifestyle, and so did her daughter. DNA sequencing done on them showed that a heterozygous mutation in their DEC2 gene, said mutation was later proved to be responsible for their short sleep phenotype through the use of mouse animal models.

The ADRB1 gene mutation was discovered in 2019 by Ying-Hui Fu when she described a large, 5-generation family where the short sleeping phenotype segregated as an autosomal dominant trait in multiple members. After having SNP-based linkage analysis followed by whole-exome sequencing, the researchers leading the study found a rare genetic mutation in the family's ADRB1 gene that was present in affected family members but absent in otherwise unaffected family members. Like in the other study, mouse animal models confirmed the role this mutation had in the short sleep phenotype that segregated within the family.

The NPSR1 gene mutation was discovered in 2019 by Ying-Hui Fu, her patients were a father and his son, both of whom had the short sleep phenotype. Whole-exome sequencing done on them afterwards revealed a heterozygous mutation in the NPSR1 gene which the both of them shared. Like in the last two studies, mouse animal models also helped confirm this mutation's involvement in the short-sleep phenotype.

The GMR1 gene mutations were discovered in 2021, by Ying-Hui Fui, when she described affected members from 2 un-related families.

Media coverage 

The trait later entered the public eye a few years afterwards, with various sources describing it as a "desirable superpower" of sorts. Informal names given by the media to natural short sleepers include nicknames such as "the sleepless elite".

Notable people 

Various famous/historical individuals have been known to sleep for 4 hours or less across human history, these include:

Barack Obama
Donald Trump
Thomas Alva Edison
Mozart
Martha Stewart
Elon Musk
Jim Cramer
Margaret Thatcher
Nikola Tesla
Tom Ford
Kelly Ripa

See also 

Sleep apnea
Fatal familial insomnia
Hypersomnia
Sleep paralysis
Sleep walking
Parasomnia

References 

Sleep physiology